Mundelein High School (MHS) is a public four-year high school located in Mundelein, Illinois, a northern suburb of Chicago, Illinois, in the United States. The school serves the Village of Mundelein and parts of surrounding villages, include Vernon Hills, Grayslake, Hawthorn Woods, Round Lake, Wauconda and Libertyville. Its feeder schools include Carl Sandburg Middle School, Fremont Middle School, West Oak Middle School portions of Hawthorn Middle School North and Hawthorn Middle School South.

History
The school was contracted in 1960 and commenced classes in 1961. The school was expanded in 1973, 1977, 1987 (including a new pool), 1997, and 2016 (including a new STEM wing).

Academics
At one time, the school was home to an "Aviation Technology" class from 1980 until the early 2000s in which students constructed an airplane from a kit for private sponsors. The class  prepared future aviation technicians. It was one of the few aviation technology programs in a high school. It was removed from the curriculum due to lack of sponsors and a lack of accredited teachers, as the school required teachers to not only hold an Illinois teaching certificate but also either a pilot's license or an airframe-and-powerplant mechanic certificate from the FAA.

During the 1992-93 school year, Mundelein High School was awarded the Blue Ribbon School Award of Excellence by the United States Department of Education.

Athletics
The Mundelein Mustangs compete in the North Suburban Conference. The boys' gymnatics team won state championships in 1989, 1990, 1993, 1998, 1999, and 2000.

Performing arts
MHS fields two competitive show choirs: the varsity/open division "Sound" and the JV/prep division “Reverb”. The program formerly hosted an annual competition.

Mundelein also has a competitive dance team, which hosts an annual invitational.

Notable alumni
Ryan Borucki, professional baseball player
Sean McNanie, professional football player

References

External links
 Official Website

Public high schools in Illinois
Mundelein, Illinois
Schools in Lake County, Illinois
Educational institutions established in 1961
1961 establishments in Illinois